Robert Fox (born 2 November 1931) is a former Australian rules footballer who played with Essendon in the Victorian Football League (VFL).

Fox hailed from Yarck but was recruited to Essendon via Thornton. He kicked 24 goals from 19 games for Essendon in the 1955 VFL season, three of which came in the semi final against Geelong.

His last game for Essendon was the 1957 VFL Grand Final, which he played as a centre half-forward, in a losing team.

He then decided to return to the country and played at Alexandra in 1958. At the end of the year he retired, but later made some appearances for the Katunga Football Club.

References

1931 births
Australian rules footballers from Victoria (Australia)
Essendon Football Club players
Living people